MaHa is the acronym of the comedy duo Madan Krishna Shrestha and Hari Bansha Acharya of Nepal in Devanagari script. The acronym was coined by another contemporary comedian, Rajaram Paudel. MaHa is also renowned for trying to awaken society on social and political issues through their programs.

Contributions
MaHa's style is focused on creating awareness through laughter. They have also been involved in creating social activities and political freedom movements. Their production includes 15 Gate, Gaunkhane Katha, Lobhi Papi, Dashain, Je Bho Ramrai Bho (2003), Balidan, SLC, 216777, Raat, 205, Chiranjibi, Jalpari, Oh:Ho, Madan Bahadur Hari Bahadur, and Aama.

They also showcase stage shows including their yearly Gaijatra shows, except for 2007 when they could not stage the show due to venue problems.

References

External links
 Maha Sanchar on YouTube

Newar people
20th-century Nepalese screenwriters
Nepalese male film actors
Living people
Nepalese male comedians
Year of birth missing (living people)